Rear Admiral Frederic R. Harris (April 10, 1875 – July 20, 1949), of New York City, was a philatelist who amassed some of the finest collections in philatelic history.

Collecting interests
Harris was famous for his collection of Hawaii postage stamps. Along with Henry Albert Meyer, William J. Davey, John K. Bash and others. he co-authored Hawaii, Its Stamps and Postal History in 1948. In addition to his Hawaii collection, Harris had created world-class collections of stamps of Ceylon and Italian States.

Philatelic activity
Harris was a founder and trustee of the Philatelic Foundation, and, at the time of his death, he was serving as president and expert. Harris was also the chairman of the Directing Committee for the 1936 Third International Philatelic Exhibition (TIPEX) and chairman of the 1947 Centenary International Stamp Exhibition (CIPEX).

Honors and awards
Admiral Harris was elected to the American Philatelic Society Hall of Fame in 1950.

See also
 Philately
 Philatelic literature

References
 Rear Admiral Frederic R. Harris

1875 births
1949 deaths
Philatelic literature
American philatelists
People from New York City
American Philatelic Society